The Swiss Army Central Band is a military band that is part of the Swiss Army and the representative band of the Swiss Armed Forces. It is part of the Military Music Competence Center (Kompetenzzentrum Militärmusik). It is based on mostly German and French, but also modern British influences. It consists of 80 musicians who every year send a delegation abroad to introduce Swiss Military Music to the world. In recent years, the band visited military tattoos in Argentina, Brazil, Greece, China, Finland South Korea, Singapore, New Zealand and the United States. Events around the world have included the Spasskaya Tower Military Music Festival and Tattoo, the Norwegian Military Tattoo and the Virginia International Tattoo. The band is the primary host and participant of the Basel Tattoo.

It is currently under the direction of Major Aldo Werlen and Drum Major Staff Adjutant Philipp Rütsche. Swiss international euphonium soloist Thomas Rüedi was a soloist in the band from 1996 to 2003. The band performs in its distinctive red uniform.

See also
Staff Band of the Bundeswehr
French Republican Guard Band
Gardemusik Wien
Italian Army Music Band

References

External links
Mir sein die Kaiserjäger - Swiss Army Central Band
Virginia International Tattoo: Swiss Army Central Band
Show Basel Tattoo 2018 - Swiss Army Central Band
Swiss Army Central Band - Sveitsi

Military of Switzerland
Military bands
Wind bands